Leonard Patrick "Red" Kelly  (July 9, 1927 – May 2, 2019) was a Canadian professional ice hockey player and coach. He was also a Liberal Member of Parliament for the Toronto-area riding of York West from 1962 to 1965, during which time he also won the Stanley Cup—twice—while actively playing for the Toronto Maple Leafs. Kelly played on more Stanley Cup-winning teams (eight) than any other player who never played for the Montreal Canadiens; Henri Richard (11), Jean Beliveau (10), Yvan Cournoyer (10) and Claude Provost (9) won their Cups with the Canadiens. He was also the only player to have never played for the Canadiens to be part of two of the nine dynasties recognized by the National Hockey League (NHL) in its history. In 2017, Kelly was named one of the '100 Greatest NHL Players' in history.

Early career
Kelly attended Doan's Hollow Public School in Port Dover, then attended St. Michael's College School. He grew up listening to Foster Hewitt's broadcasts of the Toronto Maple Leafs, and was particularly inspired by the style of their hard-charging defenceman, Red Horner. However, while playing junior hockey for the St. Michael's Majors, he was encouraged to refine his style by his coach, former Leaf great Joe Primeau.

NHL career

The Maple Leafs passed on Kelly after a scout predicted he would not last 20 games in the NHL (despite the Majors' long relationship with the Leafs) and the 19-year-old joined the Detroit Red Wings in 1947. In 1954 he was runner-up for the Hart Memorial Trophy and won the James Norris Memorial Trophy as the NHL's top defenceman, the first time the trophy was awarded and also won the Lady Byng Trophy in 1951, 1953 and 1954 as the NHL's most gentlemanly player. In over 12 years as a Red Wing the team won eight regular-season championships and four Stanley Cups. He was chosen as a First Team All-Star defenceman six times.

Kelly played much of the 1958–59 season with a broken ankle. However, this was a closely guarded team secret until midway through the next season, a reporter asked Kelly why he'd been off his game for much of 1959.  Kelly replied, "Don't know.  Might have been the ankle." WhenRed Wings GM Jack Adams got wind of the story, he was furious, and immediately brokered a four-player deal in which Kelly was sent to the New York Rangers.  However, Kelly scuttled the deal when he announced he would retire rather than go to New York.

Maple Leafs head coach and general manager Punch Imlach stepped in and tried to talk Kelly into playing for him.  Though he disliked Maple Leaf Gardens and was still smarting from the scout's assessment of him 13 years earlier, Kelly agreed to be traded to the Leafs. Once Kelly arrived in Toronto, Imlach asked him to switch positions and become a full-time centre, figuring that Kelly could easily match up against the Montreal Canadiens' Jean Béliveau.  The switch paid off.  Already a great playmaker, Kelly turned Frank Mahovlich into one of the most lethal goal scorers in NHL history.

Kelly won his fourth Lady Byng Award in 1961. In his eight seasons with the Leafs, they won four Stanley Cups–the same number of times he'd won in Detroit. In 1,316 regular season games, he scored 281 goals and 542 assists for 823 points. At the time of his retirement, he was seventh all time in career points, fifth in assists, 13th in goals, and second only to Gordie Howe in games played.  In 164 playoff games, he scored 33 goals and 59 assists for 92 points.

Coaching career
After the Maple Leafs won the Stanley Cup in 1967, Kelly announced his retirement as a player, and negotiated with the expansion Los Angeles Kings to be their inaugural coach on the strength of Imlach's assertion that Toronto would not stand in the way of Kelly's coaching career. Imlach insisted, however, that Los Angeles draft Kelly in the expansion draft, and after the Kings failed to do so, refused to release Kelly's rights until Los Angeles traded minor-league defenceman Ken Block to the Leafs. Kelly guided the Kings to second place in the West Division and made the playoffs two years in a row.

He left the Kings for a one-year contract to succeed Red Sullivan as coach of the Pittsburgh Penguins on July 2, 1969. After the Penguins ended the 1969–70 season with its first-ever playoff appearance and advanced to the semifinals, Kelly signed a five-year, $250,000 contract on May 21, 1970 to continue as coach, and also replaced Jack Riley as general manager. With the team struggling in sixth place in the NHL West Division during a stretch of winning only two of 22 contests and having failed to qualify for the postseason in 1970–71, Kelly was pressured to relinquish his general manager title back to Riley on January 29, 1972 in order to concentrate on his coaching duties. Amid a slump in which the Penguins won only two games with three draws and seven losses and slid into fifth place in the eight-team NHL West Division, Kelly was fired and replaced by Ken Schinkel on January 13, 1973.

Kelly returned to the Maple Leafs after signing a four-year contract to succeed John McLellan as coach on August 20, 1973. He stayed in the position from the 1973–74 season to 1976–77. The team earned a playoff berth in all four seasons with Kelly as head coach but got eliminated in the quarterfinals each time. A bizarre aspect of his tenure as Maple Leafs coach occurred during the 1975–76 quarterfinal series when he promoted pyramid power amongst his players to counter the Philadelphia Flyers' use of Kate Smith's rendition of "God Bless America." He hung a plastic model of a pyramid in the team's clubhouse after a pair of away defeats to start the series. The players embraced the superstition after observing team captain Darryl Sittler first place his hockey sticks beneath the pyramid and then stand under it for exactly four minutes. The Maple Leafs managed to win all three of its home matches before losing the series' decisive Game 7. Kelly was fired at the end of the 1976–1977 season, ending 30 consecutive years at ice level in the NHL. Kelly coached 742 regular season games during his NHL career of which his team won 278, lost 300 and tied 134. He coached 62 NHL playoff games winning 24 of these.

Political career
Kelly was elected to the House of Commons of Canada in the 1962 federal election at the York West riding under the Liberal party led by Lester B. Pearson. He defeated Conservative incumbent John Hamilton. He was re-elected there in the following year's election in which his Progressive Conservative opponent was future NHL agent Alan Eagleson. Kelly continued to play with the Toronto Maple Leafs during his terms as a Member of Parliament. During the Great Canadian Flag Debate, he received opposition from Leafs owner Conn Smythe who opposed Pearson's plans to replace the Red Ensign flag with the Maple Leaf. He did not seek re-election in 1965, but left federal politics after his two terms in the 25th and 26th Canadian Parliaments, because he wanted more time with his family. He was succeeded in York West by fellow Liberal Robert Winters.

While a member of parliament, Kelly appeared as himself on the October 29, 1962 episode of the game show To Tell the Truth. He received three of four possible votes.

Achievements and facts

 Named a first team All-Star on defense in 1951, 1952, 1953, 1954, 1955 and 1957.
 Named a Second Team All-Star on defense in 1950 and 1956.
 Name was engraved on the Stanley Cup in 1950, 1952, 1954, 1955 (with Detroit)
 Name was engraved on the Stanley Cup in 1962, 1963, 1964, 1967 (with Toronto).
 Kelly was elected to the Hockey Hall of Fame in 1969.
 In 1998, he was ranked number 22 on The Hockey News' list of the 100 greatest hockey players.
 In 2001, he was made a Member of the Order of Canada.
 Inducted to the Ontario Sports Hall of Fame in 2001.
 Toronto Maple Leafs #4 retired on October 15, 2016
 In the fall of 2016, Kelly published his autobiography "The Red Kelly Story" by ECW Press with co-authors L. Waxy Gregoire and David M. Dupuis, both of Penetanguishene, Ontario.
 In January 2017, Kelly was part of the first group of players to be named one of the 100 Greatest NHL Players in history.
 Detroit Red Wings #4 was retired on February 1, 2019

Personal life
Kelly married Andra Carol McLaughlin, an American figure skating star, in 1959. They had four children.  
Kelly's son Leonard Patrick Kelly Jr. represented Canada in the Albertville and Lillehammer Olympics in Long Track Speed Skating. Kelly's grandson George Waddell represents GBR in ice dance with his partner Sasha Fear. Another grandson Bruce Waddell represents Canada in ice dance with his partner Natalie D'Alessandro. Kelly was the granduncle of hockey player Mark Jankowski of the Calgary Flames. On May 2, 2019, Kelly died at the age of 91.

Career statistics 

* Stanley Cup Champion.

Coaching record

See also
Captain (hockey)
List of NHL players with 1000 games played

References

External links

 
 

1927 births
2019 deaths
Canadian expatriate ice hockey players in the United States
Canadian ice hockey centres
Canadian ice hockey defencemen
Canadian people of Irish descent
Canadian sportsperson-politicians
Detroit Red Wings captains
Detroit Red Wings players
Hockey Hall of Fame inductees
Ice hockey people from Ontario
James Norris Memorial Trophy winners
Lady Byng Memorial Trophy winners
Liberal Party of Canada MPs
Los Angeles Kings coaches
Members of the House of Commons of Canada from Ontario
Members of the Order of Canada
National Hockey League All-Stars
Pittsburgh Penguins coaches
Sportspeople from Norfolk County, Ontario
Stanley Cup champions
Toronto Maple Leafs coaches
Toronto Maple Leafs players
Toronto St. Michael's Majors players
Canadian ice hockey coaches